A cana was a unit of length used in the former Crown of Aragon. It is around the same value as the vara of Aragon, a seldom used Spanish and Portuguese unit of length.

See also
 List of obsolete units of measurement
 Portuguese customary units
 Spanish customary units

References

Obsolete units of measurement
Units of length